Rajabhatkhawa is a small town situated just outside the Buxa Tiger Reserve in the Kalchini CD block in the Alipurduar subdivision of the Alipurduar district in West Bengal, India. It is known for its natural environment, and is surrounded by forest.  All the permits for the entry to the Buxa Tiger reserve can be taken from here.

Etymology
The name of the place literally means "(the place) where the king had a meal". The folklore is that the kings of the princely state Koch Bihar used to come here for having picnic in the forests.

Geography

Location

Area overview
Alipurduar district is covered by two maps. It is an extensive area in the eastern end of the Dooars in West Bengal. It is undulating country, largely forested, with numerous rivers flowing down from the outer ranges of the Himalayas in Bhutan. It is a predominantly rural area with 79.38% of the population living in the rural areas. The district has 1 municipal town and 20 census towns and that means that 20.62% of the population lives in the urban areas. The scheduled castes and scheduled tribes, taken together, form more than half the population in all the six community development blocks in the district. There is a high concentration of tribal people (scheduled tribes) in the three northern blocks of the district.

Note: The map alongside presents some of the notable locations in the subdivision. All places marked in the map are linked in the larger full screen map.

Transport

National Highway 31C passes through Rajabhat Khawa. Rajabhatkhawa also has a railway station Rajabhatkhawa Railway Station which is situated on the New Jalpaiguri-Alipurduar-Samuktala Road Line.

Rajabhatkhawa-Jainti line is a new project sanctioned in 2012-13.

References

External links
 Everything about Rajabhatkhawa
 About Rajabhat Khawa
 Tourist Resort at Rajabhatkhawa
About Rajabhatkhawa Town

Cities and towns in Alipurduar district